Diaka  is a commune of the Cercle of Ténenkou in the Mopti Region of Mali. The principal village lies at Dia. In 2009 the commune had a population of 19,763.

References

External links
.

Communes of Mopti Region